Randy Krummenacher (born 24 February 1990) is a Swiss motorcycle racer.

Career

Early life
Krummenacher was born in Grüt, Zürich, Switzerland.

125cc World Championship
In 2007 he competed in Grand Prix motorcycle racing's 125cc category for the Red Bull KTM team.

On 10 June 2007 Krummenacher finished 3rd in the Catalan motorcycle Grand Prix, scoring his first podium.

On Monday 24 March 2008 Krummenacher was injured when he crashed his mountain bike while training on a snow-covered downhill run. Shortly afterward, he traveled to Jerez, Spain for the upcoming Spanish motorcycle Grand Prix where his injury was initially diagnosed as a bruised rib. On Friday 28 March 2008 Krummenacher was too ill to practice. He was subsequently taken to a hospital in Jerez where it was discovered that he had lost more than 3 liters of blood and he immediately underwent life-saving surgery to remove his ruptured spleen. In 2009, Krummenacher rode for the De Graaf Aprilia team, partnering Danny Webb.

Supersport & Superbike World Championship
For the 2016 season, Krummenacher moved into the Supersport World Championship with Kawasaki Puccetti Racing, partnering defending champion Kenan Sofuoğlu, coming in 3rd in the championship.

After moving up to the Superbike category for the 2017 season which he finished in 16th place, Krummenacher made his return to Supersport in 2018 with the Bardahl Evan Bros. WorldSSP Team scoring three podium finishes, including a win in Thailand, in his first 4 races of the season.

2022
In 2022, Krummenacher move to CM Racing Team.

Career statistics

Grand Prix motorcycle racing

By season

By class

Races by year
(key) (Races in bold indicate pole position; races in italics indicate fastest lap)

Supersport World Championship

Races by year
(key) (Races in bold indicate pole position; races in italics indicate fastest lap)

Superbike World Championship

Races by year
(key) (Races in bold indicate pole position; races in italics indicate fastest lap)

References

External links

 
 

1990 births
Living people
Swiss-German people
Swiss motorcycle racers
125cc World Championship riders
People from Hinwil District
Moto2 World Championship riders
Supersport World Championship riders
Superbike World Championship riders
Sportspeople from the canton of Zürich